Greco is a common Italian surname, ranking 10th among the most widespread surnames in Italy, and it literally means "Greek". Historically, its popularity is due to the frequent relationships between Italy and Greece: in particular, it spread within the Arbëreshë minority emigrated from Albanian populated parts of Greece since the 15th century. 

Variants of the surname include Del Greco, Della Greca, Greci, Grego, Grieco, La Greca, Lagreca, Lo Greco, Logreco, Logrieco, Greca, Grech, Grecco, etc.

Geographical distribution
As of 2014, 62.6% of all known bearers of the surname Greco were residents of Italy (frequency 1:715), 17.7% of the United States (1:14,906), 6.1% of Argentina (1:5,090),  4.2% of Brazil (1:35,328), 2.4% of Canada (1:11,050) and 2.0% of France (1:24,844).

In Italy, the frequency of the surname was higher than national average (1:715) in the following regions:
 1. Calabria (1:155)
 2. Apulia (1:198)
 3. Sicily (1:282)
 4. Molise (1:377) 

In Argentina, the frequency of the surname was higher than national average (1:5,090) in the following provinces:
 1. Buenos Aires (1:2,234)
 2. Tierra del Fuego Province (1:2,603)
 3. Buenos Aires Province (1:3,163)
 4. Santa Fe Province (1:4,827)

List of persons with the surname
 Anthony Greco, American ice hockey player
 Antonio Greco, Bolivian footballer
 Buddy Greco (1926–2017), American singer and pianist
 Charles Pasquale Greco (1894–1987), American prelate of the Roman Catholic Church
 Charles R. Greco (1873–1963), American architect
 Christian Greco, Italian Egyptologist
 Cosetta Greco (1930–2002), Italian film actress
 Daniel Greco, Swiss footballer
 Daniele Greco (born 1989), Italian triple jump athlete
 Daniele Greco (footballer) (born 1988), Italian footballer 
 Demetrio Greco, Italian footballer
 Dick A. Greco (born 1933), American politician
 Don Greco, American football player
 Edgar Pérez Greco, Venezuelan footballer
 Emidio Greco (1938–2012), Italian film director
 Emilio Greco (1913–1995), Italian sculptor
 Eric Greco, American bridge player
 Francesco Greco (1942–2018), Italian lawyer and politician
 Francesco Maria Greco (1857–1931), Italian Roman Catholic priest
 Gaetano Greco (c. 1657 – c. 1728), Italian Baroque composer
 Gennaro Greco (1663–1714), Italian vedute painter
 Gerardo Greco, Italian journalist
 Gioachino Greco (c. 1600 – c. 1634), Italian chess player and writer
 Giovanni Greco, Italian badminton player
 Giuseppe Greco (1952–1985), Italian member of the Sicilian Mafia
 Giuseppe Greco (footballer, born 1958), Italian footballer
 Giuseppe Greco (footballer, born 1983), Italian footballer
 James J. Greco (born 1958), American businessman and entrepreneur
 Jacquie Greco, American ice hockey player
 Jim Greco (born 1977), American skateboarder
 Joey Greco (born 1972), American television producer
 John Greco, American football player
 John Greco (philosopher), American philosopher
 José Greco (1918–2000), American flamenco dancer and choreographer
 Joseph Greco, American writer
 Joseph A. Greco (1919–2006), American politician
 Juliette Gréco (1927–2020), French chanson singer and actress
 Leandro Greco (born 1986), Italian footballer 
 Leo Greco, radio personality
 Marco Greco (born 1963), Brazilian motorcycle racer
 Marco Greco (actor), American actor
 Mario Greco, Italian businessman
 Michael Greco (disambiguation), several persons
Michael Greco (actor) (born 1970), British actor and poker player
Michael S. Greco (born 1942), former president of the American Bar Association
Michael Greco (police officer), United States Marshal for the Southern District of New York
 Michele Greco (1924–2008), Italian member of the Sicilian Mafia
 Orazio Greco, Italian Roman Catholic prelate
 Paige Greco, Australian Paralympic cyclist
 Paul Greco (1955–2008), American actor
 Peter Greco (born 1947), Canadian soccer player
 Perlita Greco (1906–2001), American actress
 Phil Greco, American football coach
 Ralph S. Greco (1942–2019), American surgeon
 Richard Greco Jr., American politician
 Roberto Greco, Italian artist
 Rosemarie Greco, banker
 Salvatore Greco (disambiguation), several persons
Salvatore "Ciaschiteddu" Greco (1923–1978), Sicilian Mafia boss
Salvatore "The Engineer" Greco (born 1924), Sicilian Mafia boss
Salvatore "The Senator" Greco, member of the Greco Mafia clan
Salvatore Greco (actor), featured on the German TV series Alles was zählt
Salvatore Greco (politician), leader of the Italian political party Apulia First of All
Salvatore Greco (violinist) (born 1964), Italian violinist
 Sam Greco, Australian full contact karateka
 Sebastiano Greco, Italian volleyball player
 Stephen R. Greco (1919–2000), American politician
 Suzanne Greco (born 1957/58), American businesswoman of Subway fast food chain
 Thomas H. Greco Jr., economist
 Vicente Greco (1888–1924), Argentinian composer

See also
 Greco
 Grego

References

Italian-language surnames
Italian toponymic surnames
Ethnonymic surnames